Mount Porezen is a mountain of the outlying Alps located in Slovenia. It is the highest summit of the Slovenian Prealps.

Geography 
The mountain belongs to the Gorizia Statistical Region.

Access to the summit
The suggested route for the mountain starts from Cerkno and climbs though Poce, following a marked footpath to the footpath.

There are also popular routes from Davča and Petrovo Brdo.

Maps
 Idrijsko in Cerkljansko (1:50,000 scale) and Škofjeloško in Cerkljansko hribovje (1:50,000 scale).

References

External links

Cerkno Hills
One-thousanders of Slovenia
Mountains of the Alps
Mountains of the Slovene Littoral
Mountains of Upper Carniola
Natura 2000 in Slovenia